This article shows the rosters of all participating teams at the 2017 FIVB Volleyball Men's Club World Championship in Poland.

Pool A

ZAKSA Kędzierzyn-Koźle
The following is the roster of the Polish club ZAKSA Kędzierzyn-Koźle in the 2017 FIVB Volleyball Men's Club World Championship.

 Head coach:  Andrea Gardini

Cucine Lube Civitanova
The following is the roster of the Italian club Cucine Lube Civitanova in the 2017 FIVB Volleyball Men's Club World Championship.

 Head coach:  Giampaolo Medei

Sada Cruzeiro Vôlei
The following is the roster of the Brazilian club Sada Cruzeiro Vôlei in the 2017 FIVB Volleyball Men's Club World Championship.

 Head coach:  Marcelo Méndez

Sarmayeh Bank Tehran
The following is the roster of the Iranian club Sarmayeh Bank Tehran in the 2017 FIVB Volleyball Men's Club World Championship.

 Head coach:  Mostafa Karkhaneh

Pool B

PGE Skra Bełchatów
The following is the roster of the Polish club PGE Skra Bełchatów in the 2017 FIVB Volleyball Men's Club World Championship.

 Head coach:  Roberto Piazza

Zenit Kazan
The following is the roster of the Russian club Zenit Kazan in the 2017 FIVB Volleyball Men's Club World Championship.

 Head coach:  Vladimir Alekno

Personal Bolívar
The following is the roster of the Argentine club Personal Bolívar in the 2017 FIVB Volleyball Men's Club World Championship.

 Head coach:  Javier Weber

Shanghai Golden Age
The following is the roster of the Chinese club Shanghai Golden Age in the 2017 FIVB Volleyball Men's Club World Championship.

 Head coach:  Shen Qiong

References

External links
Official website

2017 in men's volleyball
C